Emiliano Jorge Rubén Méndez (born 15 February 1989) is an Argentine professional footballer who plays as a midfielder for Sarmiento.

Career
Méndez started his career with Alumni de Los Hornos, before joining Gimnasia y Esgrima. He was selected for his professional debut on 15 May 2010 versus Atlético Tucumán, featuring for the last twenty-three minutes of a 3–3 draw. Fifteen appearances followed across the following three seasons. Primera B Nacional team Villa San Carlos completed the signing of Méndez on 7 July 2013. Twelve appearances followed. In January 2014, Méndez agreed to join Estudiantes of Torneo Argentino A. He scored his first senior goal on 9 May against Defensores de Belgrano. The midfielder departed after four goals in seventy-four games.

On 24 June 2016, Méndez joined Categoría Primera A side Atlético Huila. His first appearance arrived on 24 July during a victory over Deportivo Cali, with his final match being a 2–3 defeat to Cortuluá on 20 May 2017; a match in which he was sent off in after sixty-five minutes. Méndez returned to Argentina in the following July, signing for Primera B Nacional's Deportivo Morón. Having participated in eighteen fixtures during 2017–18, Méndez switched Deportivo Morón for Arsenal de Sarandí ahead of 2018–19.

Career statistics
.

References

External links

1989 births
Living people
Footballers from La Plata
Argentine footballers
Association football midfielders
Argentine expatriate footballers
Expatriate footballers in Colombia
Argentine expatriate sportspeople in Colombia
Argentine Primera División players
Primera Nacional players
Torneo Argentino A players
Torneo Federal A players
Categoría Primera A players
Club de Gimnasia y Esgrima La Plata footballers
Club Atlético Villa San Carlos footballers
Club Sportivo Estudiantes players
Atlético Huila footballers
Deportivo Morón footballers
Arsenal de Sarandí footballers
Club Atlético Sarmiento footballers